Juan Ecker (11 October 1930 – 10 December 2005) was an Argentine rower. He competed in the men's coxed four event at the 1952 Summer Olympics.

References

External links
 

1930 births
2005 deaths
Argentine male rowers
Olympic rowers of Argentina
Rowers at the 1952 Summer Olympics
Pan American Games medalists in rowing
Pan American Games gold medalists for Argentina
Pan American Games silver medalists for Argentina
Rowers at the 1955 Pan American Games